Dikoleps depressa is a minute species of sea snail, a marine gastropod mollusk in the family Skeneidae.

Description
The height of the shell attains 0.8 mm.

Distribution
This species occurs off Sicily in the Mediterranean Sea.

References

 Monterosato T. A. (di), 1880: Conchiglie della zona degli abissi; Bullettino della Società Malacologica Italiana, Pisa 6: 50–82
 Gofas, S.; Le Renard, J.; Bouchet, P. (2001). Mollusca, in: Costello, M.J. et al. (Ed.) (2001). European register of marine species: a check-list of the marine species in Europe and a bibliography of guides to their identification. Collection Patrimoines Naturels, 50: pp. 180–213

External links
 

depressa
Gastropods described in 1880